Andrew Hunter Wantz (born October 13, 1995) is an American professional baseball pitcher for the Los Angeles Angels of Major League Baseball (MLB). He made his MLB debut in 2021.

Amateur career
A native of Holly Springs, North Carolina, Wantz played college baseball for the University of North Carolina at Greensboro. In 2016, he played collegiate summer baseball with the Bourne Braves of the Cape Cod Baseball League where he was named a league all-star. Wantz was selected by the Los Angeles Angels in the seventh round of the 2018 MLB draft.

Professional career
Wantz made his professional debut with the rookie-level Orem Owlz. He also played for the Single-A Burlington Bees, pitching to a cumulative 1-2 record and 2.74 ERA in 18 games. In 2019, Wantz split the season the High-A Inland Empire 66ers and the Double-A Mobile BayBears, posting a 5-9 record and 5.34 ERA with 112 strikeouts in 96.0 innings of work.

Wantz did not play in a game in 2020 due to the cancellation of the minor league season because of the COVID-19 pandemic. He was assigned to the Triple-A Salt Lake Bees to begin the 2021 season, where he recorded a 2.10 ERA in 8 appearances.

On July 3, 2021, Wantz was selected to the 40-man roster and promoted to the major leagues for the first time. He made his MLB debut the following day, pitching an inning and a third of relief against the Baltimore Orioles.

On April 19, 2022, the Angels recalled Wantz from Triple-A Salt Lake and added him to the active roster.

Wantz made his first major league starting appearance on June 27, 2022 at the last minute as an opener, but was ejected for the first time in his career after one pitch in the second inning (and twelve pitches total), which hit Mariner Jesse Winker, triggering a bench-clearing brawl which resulted in eight players and both team managers being ejected, including Wantz and Winker. Wantz threw a pitch behind the head of the second batter of the game, Julio Rodríguez, in the first inning. The day after, Wantz was suspended three games by Major League Baseball, with his manager Phil Nevin receiving a ten-game suspension for ordering a beanball despite both teams being warned not to.

References

External links

1995 births
Living people
People from Holly Springs, North Carolina
Baseball players from North Carolina
Major League Baseball pitchers
Los Angeles Angels players
UNC Greensboro Spartans baseball players
Bourne Braves players
Orem Owlz players
Burlington Bees players
Inland Empire 66ers of San Bernardino players
Mobile BayBears players
Salt Lake Bees players